The Köpinge Sandstone is a highly calcareous and glauconitic sandstone geologic formation of the Vomb Trough in Skåne, southernmost Sweden. The formation dates to the latest early to middle late Campanian stage of the Late Cretaceous and has provided fossils of ammonites, belemnites, the shark Cretalamna borealis and the mosasaurid Hainosaurus. Ex situ occurrences in Pleistocene deposits have provided a dorsal vertebra of a possible elasmosaurid.

Description 
The Köpinge Sandstone has been recorded from a number of small outcrops, the majority of which are not accessible today, northeast of the town of Ystad, around Köpingemolla, Svenstorp, Valleberga, Ingelstorp, Herrestad and Fredriksberg.

The formation comprises yellow highly calcareous and glauconitic sandstones and ranges in age (on the basis of abundant belemnites and ammonites) from the latest early Campanian to the middle late Campanian.

Christensen (1986) recorded two belemnite assemblages from the area, i.e., an older one comprising Belemnellocamax mammillatus and Belemnitella mucronata , and a younger one with B. mucronata and Belemnitella aff. langei. Ammonites (Gaudryceras sp., Pachydiscus haldemsis, Patagiosites stobaei, Nostoceras junior, Lewyites elegans, Baculites cf. aquilaensis, B. angustus, B. schlueteri, Trachyscaphites spiniger spiniger and Hoploscaphites ikorfatensis) from the Köpinge district indicate an early late Campanian age. The formation has also provided fossils of the mosasaurid Hainosaurus.

An isolated dorsal vertebra of a possible elasmosaurid was found in a Pleistocene Geschiebe, an ex situ occurrence of the Campanian formation, in southern Sweden.

The shark Cretalamna borealis recovered from the formation was described in 2015.

See also 
 List of fossiliferous stratigraphic units in Sweden
 Kristianstad Basin
 Folkeslunda Limestone, Ordovician fossiliferous formation of Sweden with ex situ fossil assemblages

References

Bibliography 

 
 
 
 

Geologic formations of Sweden
Upper Cretaceous Series of Europe
Cretaceous Sweden
Campanian Stage
Sandstone formations
Shallow marine deposits
Paleontology in Sweden
Formations